Marcelo Alejandro De Souza (born September 30, 1975) is a Uruguayan footballer currently playing as a midfielder for Boston River in the Uruguayan Segunda División.

External links

Profile at BDFA

1975 births
Living people
Uruguayan footballers
Uruguay international footballers
Footballers from Montevideo
Racing Club de Montevideo players
Peñarol players
Tianjin Jinmen Tiger F.C. players
Danubio F.C. players
C.D.S. Vida players
Sanat Naft Abadan F.C. players
Club Atlético Vélez Sarsfield footballers
Instituto footballers
Deportivo Maldonado players
Liga Nacional de Fútbol Profesional de Honduras players
Argentine Primera División players
Expatriate footballers in Argentina
Expatriate footballers in Honduras
Expatriate footballers in Iran
Uruguayan expatriate sportspeople in Argentina
Expatriate footballers in China
Uruguayan expatriate sportspeople in China
Uruguayan expatriate footballers
Association football midfielders